IGSM may refer to:

 International Geodetic Student Meeting (IGSM)
 Integrated Global System Model, an Integrated Assessment Model developed by MIT
 Isabella Stewart Gardner Museum